Nemunėlio Radviliškis is a town in Biržai district municipality, in Panevėžys County, northern Lithuania. According to the 2011 census, the town has a population of 566 people.

History
On 8 August 1941 the Jews of the town, about 70–80 men, women and children, were shot in Skamarakai grove.

Notable people 

 Vincentas Sladkevičius (1920–2000), Lithuanian Cardinal of the Roman Catholic Church

References 

Biržai District Municipality
Towns in Panevėžys County
Towns in Lithuania
Holocaust locations in Lithuania